The Markel Building is an office building commissioned by the Markel Corporation and designed by Haigh Jamgochian located on Markel Road just outside the city limits of Richmond, Virginia in Henrico County. The building was inspired by a baked potato wrapped in foil served to Jamgochian while attending an American Institute of Architects' dinner. Each floor consists of a single piece of 555-foot aluminum, they are the longest unbroken pieces of aluminum ever used as siding material.

In 2009, Digital Journal declared the Markel Building to be one of "The World's 10 Ugliest Buildings"  It was listed on the National Register of Historic Places 2017.

References

Buildings and structures in Henrico County, Virginia
National Register of Historic Places in Henrico County, Virginia
Commercial buildings on the National Register of Historic Places in Virginia